RSS Intrepid (69) is the second ship of the Formidable-class stealth frigate of the Republic of Singapore Navy.

Construction and career 
RSS Intrepid was built by ST Marine Engineering  in Singapore around the late 2000s. Intrepid was commissioned on 5 February 2008.

CARAT 2009 
On 15 June 2009, RSS Intrepid, RSS Conqueror, RSS Vigour, RSS Victory, RSS Stalwart, RSS Endeavour, USS Harpers Ferry, USS Chafee and USS Chung-Hoon participated in the joint exercise in the South China Sea.

Exercise Bersama Lima 18 
Singapore, Malaysia, Australia, New Zealand and UK held Exercise Bersama Lima from 2 to 19 October 2018. One of the ships participating was RSS Intrepid.

RSS Intrepid and RSS Sovereignty conducted a joint naval exercise with the People's Liberation Army Navy ships Guiyang and Zaozhuang in the South China Sea on 24 February 2021.

Gallery

References 

Ships of the Republic of Singapore Navy
2005 ships
Formidable-class frigates
Republic of Singapore Navy